Pyropyga alticola is a species of firefly in the beetle family Lampyridae. It is found natively in Central America.

Notably, it or a close relative is believed to be the Pyropyga species which was accidentally introduced and became established as an invasive species in the Kantō Plain of Japan.

References

Lampyridae
Bioluminescent insects